Hilda López (27 September 1922 – 2 June 1996) was a Uruguayan painter and sculptor. She was best known for her abstract, gestural paintings and drawings from the 1960s, as well as for her political activism following the 1973 Uruguayan coup d'état. López's work first came to public attention in the 1960s after exhibitions in Montevideo and the USA, and she soon became an influential name in Uruguay's Informalism movement. López represented Uruguay in the São Paulo Art Biennial, and her work is part of the collection of the National Museum of Visual Arts in Uruguay.

Biography
Hilda López was born in Montevideo on 27 September 1922. Her family settled in Mataojo, Lavalleja Department, to attend to her father's business.

In 1946, she married Alberto Angenscheidt, and they had two children.

In 1960, López held her first solo exhibition at the Zaffaroni Gallery. From that moment on, she participated in numerous exhibitions and received awards for her works that became part of the country's public collections.

Spanish sculptor Jorge Oteiza's presence in Montevideo had a great influence on her work. His theories about Romero Brest's vacuum aesthetics and informalism prompted López to develop her own plastic universe. Her series Streets and inlets of Montevideo, exhibited in Washington in 1961, received a favorable critique from Frank Getlein in The Sunday Star.

In 1964, López travelled to Portugal accompanying an exhibition of Uruguayan artists. She remained there and had a relationship with the Portuguese painter Henriques Tavares. When the relationship ended, she returned to Montevideo.

In 1965, she provided the Uruguayan submission to the São Paulo Art Biennial. She participated in the occupation of the Municipal Subway in protest of the appointment of representatives of the Municipal Salon of Plastic Arts. In 1972, she participated in the reconstruction of Section 20 of the Communist Party in the Paso Molino neighbourhood.

In 1973, with the closure of official artistic training courses by the de facto government, López began to teach. In 1986, she made a mural in stone and cement in homage to the victims of the dictatorship at the Central Headquarters of the Communist Party of Uruguay.

She died in Montevideo on 2 June 1996.

Work

The series created by the artist reflects difficult times in the life of her country. Grafías (1963) shows her dexterity and temperament in ink on paper. Retratos y Coral (1978) comprises works in oil and charcoal, portraits of friends and colleagues symbolically emblematic. Los Adioses (1978) shows abandoned suitcases that evoke the melancholy of the uprooting caused by exile. Pueblos (1981) denotes the human emptiness, and Campo (1983) the social hardships of the interior of the country. El problema principal es la pobreza (1988) rounds off a testimonial sequence of the painful period of the military dictatorship in her country.

The series, made in 1962 on large format canvases used planographic ink, filling in her creative intention through expressive gesture. The ambiguous character between figuration and abstraction recorded by her works generate evocative spaces of melancholy, uprooting, and reflection.

One of her best-known works, Autorretrato con golilla roja, made in 1978 and now part of the collection of the National Museum of Visual Arts, is defined in its expressive composition by the cutting red spot of the ruff, on the monochromatism of the figure. The symbolic climate of the work reflects the situation that her country was experiencing at that time. In the series Los Adioses and Pueblos, her informalist gestures are transformed into subtlety and line suggestion. Her work transits the border between figuration and abstraction, with a palette of coordinated colours, almost monochromatic, that alludes to oppression, jail, exile, and the fear to which Uruguayan society was subjected in times of dictatorship.

Expositions
 1959: 23rd National Salon and 11th Municipal Salon
 1960: Individual exhibition at Galería Zaffaroni
 1961: Arcobaleno Award, Punta del Este
 1961: Instituto Di Tella, Buenos Aires
 1961: Pan American Union, Chicago
 1962: 1st Córdoba Biennial, Argentina
 1962: Algunos pintores abstractos, Center of Arts and Letters
 1963: Grafías 63, Amigos del Arte, Montevideo
 1963: Joint exhibit with María Freire and Amalia Nieto at the Círculo de Bellas Artes
 1964: 7 artistas de Uruguay, Galería Divulgaçao, Lisbon, Portugal
 1965: São Paulo Art Biennial, Brazil
 1965: Galería Sudarmericana, New York
 1966: Uruguayan Center of Cultural Promotion, Galería de la Ciudadela, Montevideo
 1967: Galería U, Montevideo
 1969: Urbanismo, Galería Portón de San Pedro, Montevideo
 1976: Galería Alcali, Montevideo
 1978: Retratos, Alianza Francesa, Montevideo
 1979: Los Adioses, Cinemateca Uruguaya
 1981: Pueblos, Galería Latina, Montevideo
 1983: Campo, Galería Latina, Montevideo
 1988: El problema principal es la pobreza, installation at Cinemateca Uruguaya
 1991: Rostros, Rastros, Restos, Galería Latina, Montevideo

Awards
 Acquisition Award, 12th Municipal Salon, Montevideo (1960)
 Acquisition Award, 13th Municipal Salon, Montevideo (1961)
 Acquisition Award, 14th Municipal Salon, Montevideo (1962)
 Acquisition Award, 15th Municipal Salon, Montevideo (1967)

References

1922 births
1996 deaths
20th-century Uruguayan painters
20th-century Uruguayan sculptors
20th-century Uruguayan women artists
Artists from Montevideo
Uruguayan women painters
Uruguayan women sculptors